Mosquito Island (sometimes spelled Moskito Island) is an island off the coast of Virgin Gorda and has long been a favourite for scuba divers and sailors. For many years the island was the location of a sail-in dive resort named Drake's Anchorage. Sir Richard Branson purchased the island in 2007 for £10 million.

Branson announced in 2011 that he planned to relocate ring-tailed lemurs from some zoos in Canada, Sweden, and South Africa to the island. Later relocations of red ruffed lemurs and possibly sifakas might follow. The announced plans were met with some criticism.

The island is located on the west side of Gorda Sound adjacent to Virgin Gorda and near Necker Island, which is also owned by Branson.

Barack Obama visited the island in February 2017, and learned how to kiteboard there, shortly after his retirement as President of the United States.

Name

On old nautical charts of the British Virgin Islands, the island's name is often spelled "Moskito" (possibly as an older spelling of "mosquito" - older versions of the English language did make greater use of etymological spelling).  Although modern charts usually spell the island "Mosquito" Island, and the Land Registry of the British Virgin Islands titles the island as "Mosquito" Island, Richard Branson has expressed a preference for "Moskito" Island, and most of the publicity material relating to his development has used that spelling.

Bert Kilbride, owner of Moskito Island 1960 - 1970 and the original builder/operator of Drakes Anchorage, always said it was spelled MOSKITO after the Miskito Indians that traveled through the Caribbean Islands from South or Central America, although their name is spelled Miskito.

References

Virgin Limited Edition
Private islands of the British Virgin Islands